Jeffrey Obomeghie, known as Jeffrey O, is an American educator, motivational speaker, former editor, and writer. He has served as the founding editor-in-chief of People's Express.

Biography 
Jeffrey was born in Auchi, Edo State. He was educated at the University of Lagos where he studied political science. Later, he went to the United States and continued his study in political science. He completed his further study from the University of Maryland University College, received his master's degree in human resource management from Amberton University, and doctorate degree in leadership studies from Johnson University. in 2020.

Jeffrey started his career in the hospitality industry and he went on to become the chief executive officer of Mercury Hotels. Previously, he has served as a chief operating officer of New Generation Hotels.

In 2020, he became the chief executive officer of the International Hospitality Institute that he founded. 

In 2021, Jeffrey was inducted into the Hotelier’s Guild, a society of luxury hoteliers based in Ticino, Lugano, Switzerland. That same year, he received the Industry Choice Award from Otolo, a London based community of hoteliers for his work in promoting hospitality globally. In February 2022, he joined the Board of Directors of St. Justine, the ultra-luxury travel company, as CEO, serving on the board alongside Horst Schulze, co-founder, and former COO of the Ritz Carlton Hotel Company.

Jeffrey is the author of several books of fiction and non-fiction. Kirkus Reviews described Jeffrey’s most recent thriller, Dead or Alive as a “razor-sharp crime tale” and the book’s protagonist as “a superlative hero.”

Awards 
Jeffrey was featured in the Pulse Newspaper’s list of the 10 Most Influential Nigerians in the Diaspora in 2022. Other honorees included Ngozi Okonjo-Iweala, Chimamanda Ngozi-Adichie, Adebayo Ogunlesi, John Boyega, and Anthony Joshua. In January 2022, Jeffrey was included by the Sun Newspaper in its list of the Top 25 International Newsmakers of 2021. That list also featured Wizkid, President Muhammadu Buhari, Davido, Tems, Mo Abudu, Aliko Dangote, Burna Boy, Ngozi Okonjo-Iweala, Wole Soyinka, Oby Ezekwesili, and Victor Osimhen, among others. In June 2022, he was recognized by the International Hospitality Institute as one of the 100 Most Powerful People in Global Hospitality. In October 2022, Jeffrey was honored with the Pan-African American Leadership Award (PAALA) by the African Women in Leadership Organization (AWLO) at an event in Atlanta, Georgia, which also honored Senator Donzella James Robinson, Dele Momodu, and others.

Bibliography 
 Dead or Alive
 The Collector of Butterflies
 Abraham Lincoln is Not Dead

References 

American magazine editors
1961 births
Living people
University System of Maryland alumni
Amberton University alumni